George N. Peterson Jr. (born July 8, 1950) is an American politician who served as a Republican member of the Massachusetts House of Representatives from 1995 to 2015. Representing the 9th Worcester district, he went on to serve as the House minority whip and later as the assistant minority leader before becoming commissioner of the Massachusetts Department of Fish & Game.

Early life and education
Peterson was raised in Grafton, Massachusetts. He attended Grafton Memorial Senior High School, followed by the UMass Amherst Stockbridge School of Agriculture.

Political career
Peterson first became involved in politics through his election in 1984 to the Grafton Planning Board.  Soon after, he was elected to the Board of Selectmen, a position in which he served for five years.  In 1994 Peterson was elected to represent the 9th Worcester district, consisting of Grafton, Northbridge and Upton, as well as parts of Westborough.  He has served on the Rules and Natural Resources and Agriculture committees, and had a seat on the Joint Committee on Higher Education.

Peterson retired in January 2015 upon the completion of his term.

References

George Peterson's Home Page
Massachusetts General Court

Living people
Republican Party members of the Massachusetts House of Representatives
People from Grafton, Massachusetts
University of Massachusetts Amherst College of Natural Sciences alumni
1950 births